. is a Japanese goddess, a mythological figure in the Nihon Shoki (Chronicles of Japan), the first empress of Japan, and the first wife of Emperor Jimmu. 

Although details vary, her parents are described as an influential Yamato woman and a kami. She is said to have married Emperor Jimmu and given birth to the second emperor, Emperor Suizei.

Depiction by Kojiki and Nihon Shoki

Birth 

According to Kojiki, when Kamuyamato-Iwarebiko (also known as Emperor Jimmu) was searching for a wife, he was told about a woman named  who bore a daughter after she was impregnated by Ōmononushi. Ōmononushi had taken the form of a red arrow and struck Seyadatara-hime's genitals while she was defecating in a ditch.

Like the Kojiki, the main narrative of the first volume of the Nihon Shoki first describes Himetataraisuzu-hime as the offspring of the god of Ōmononushi. However, the Nihon Shoki also contains an alternative story which portrays her as the child of the god  and the goddess  - also known as  - conceived after Kotoshironushi transformed himself into a gigantic wani and had sex with her. Likewise, the main narrative in the third and fourth volumes of Nihon Shoki refer to her as the daughter of Kotoshironushi rather than Ōmononushi.

Her house was located on the Sai River and near Sai-jinja Shrine, near Mount Miwa.

Marriage with Emperor Jimmu 
According to the Nihon Shoki and other sources, Iwarehiko (later Emperor Jimmu) left the Land of Himuka and made an expedition to the east, and after many battles, established his government in the Yamato region. Iwarehiko built the Palace of Kashiwara in modern-day Kashihara at the foot of Mount Unebi and ascended to the throne as the first emperor.

Prior to his accession to the throne, Iwarehiko needed to have a consort worthy of being the first Empress. Okume-no-mikoto, a vassal of Iwarehiko, suggested Himetataraisuzu-hime as a candidate for his wife. According to the Kojiki, Okume-no-mikoto explains the story of Himetataraisuzu-hime's birth to Iwarehiko and tells him that she deserved to be his rightful wife. In the Kojiki, there is another story in which Iwarehiko and Okume-no-mikoto witnessed seven women on the shore of the Sai River and selected a wife from among them.

Himetataraisuzu-hime had a notable poetic exchange with them, and then Jimmu stayed the night at her house.

According to the Nihon Shoki, their marriage took place on September 24 of the year before his accession. Himetataraisuzu-hime became Empress when Emperor Jimmu ascended the throne the following year.

After the death of Emperor Jimmu 
According to the Nihon Shoki, Emperor Jimmu died at the age of 127. Although there are differences in details, the Nihon Shoki and Kojiki describe a succession struggle that occurred among his children after his death.

Before he left for the eastern expedition from the "Land of Himuka", Iwarehiko had married Ohiratsuhime and they had a child. However, these children were reduced to the status of bastards when Iwarehiko made Himetataraisuzu-hime the rightful Empress. When Emperor Jimmu died, his bastard son, Tagishimi, wanted to succeed to the throne himself.

In the Kojiki, Tagishimi took the widowed Empress Himetataraisuzu-hime as his wife and tried to assassinate the legitimate children of Emperor Jimmu and Empress Himetataraisuzu-hime. Aware of his plans, Himetataraisuzu-hime wrote two poems to her children to warn them of the danger.

Learning of the plot from their mother's poems, the legitimate sons attacked Tagishimi first and defeated him. Kannuma Kawamimi-no-mikoto, who played the most active role in the attack, succeeded his father and ascended to the throne as the second emperor, Emperor Suizei. According to the Nihon Shoki, Himetataraisuzu-hime took the title of "Empress Dowager".

Emperor Suizei took Princess  (五十鈴依媛命) as his consort. Isuzuyori-hime was Himetataraisuzu-hime's younger sister and Emperor Suizei's aunt. Other versions of this story claim that Kawamata Biyori or Itoorihime became Emperor Suizei consort.

Children 
Based on the Nihon Shoki and the Kojiki, Himetataraisuzu-hime and Emperor Jimmu had three children:  (日子八井命),  (神八井耳命), and Emperor Suizei. Hikoyai is only mentioned in the Kojiki, whereas the other two children are mentioned in both texts.

Siblings 
Himetataraisuzu-hime's mother gave birth to two other children:
  - Himetataraisuzu-hime's older brother. In the Kujiki, he served Emperor Jimmu and became Shinshoku Kokusei Tayu.
  -  Himetataraisuzu-hime's sister. She became the Empress of the second emperor, Emperor Suizei.

Theories about her origin 

In the Nihon Shoki and the Kojiki, although the details of the stories differ, Himetataraisuzu-hime is depicted as having a mother who is "the daughter of an influential person (a deity) in a region" and a father who is "a deity. There is a theory that Emperor Jimmu, the first emperor of Japan, may have used the marriage of a "daughter of a god" as a way to support the legitimacy of his regime when he took a regular wife.

The mother is depicted as belonging to Mishima (Mishima, Mishima) of Settsu (Osaka Prefecture) on her mother's side and Miwa (Miwa, Miwa, Miwasan) of Yamato (Nara Prefecture) on her father's side. These suggest the cooperation of several powerful clans in the Kinki region,and this marriage is between Iwarehiko (Emperor Jimmu), a stranger from "Himuka" (Hyuga Province), and a powerful man from Bongachi Province (Yamato and Settsu Provinces)There is also a theory that this is an indication of Iwarehiko's political method of not only conquering by force, but also consolidating his control base by harmonizing with the forces in the region. As will be discussed later, there is also an interpretation that it indicates that Emperor Jimmu's forces secured iron manufacturing technology.

Grandfather: Mizokuhi of Mishima 
In the "Nihon Shoki" (Chronicles of Japan), the mother is said to be the daughter of Mishima Mizokuhi, although there are some differences in wording. "Mizokuhiis also written as 溝樴, 溝樴耳神, and 溝杙 in the Kojiki (Records of Ancient Matters), and as 湟咋, 溝杭 (Shinsen Seijiroku), Mizokui (Shinsen Seijiroku), and other characters may also be applied. "In addition, there are some historical records that refer to him as Mimi-gami, suggesting that he was an object of worship as a divine being. In the genealogy of the Kamo clan, this deity is said to be the ancestor of the Kamo clan and the Katsuragi Kunizo. There is also a theory that the name of the deity is related to "Mishima" and that it is the same deity as Shogikona, who was the ancestor deity of the Mishima prefectures.

The place name "Mishima" is thought to be Settsu Province Mishima County (present-day northern Osaka Prefecture). The Engishiki (927) lists Mishima Kamojinshya (Mishima-e, Takatsuki City) and Mizokuijinshya (Ibaraki, Osaka|Ibaraki City), suggesting that "Mizokuhi of Mishima" was worshipped in this area.

In the Edo period, Kokugaku Nencho Motoi interpreted this "mizo (groove)" to refer to a toilet built over a stream of water, and this has become a common theory. Eiichi Mitani and others have adopted this theory, and there is also a theory that the toilet is strongly related to birth rituals. Kazuo Higo (Professor Emeritus, Tokyo University of Education) disagreed, saying that "mizo" means a ditch in a paddy field. Masayuki Tsugita developed this theory, claiming that Mishima-gun was an ideal place for rice cultivation and that "Mizokuhi of Mishima" was a farming god.

Mothers: Tamakushihime and Seyadatara-hime 
Her mother's name is Tamakushihime in the Nihon Shoki (Chronicles of Japan) and Seyadatara-hime in the Kojiki (Records of Ancient Matters). Both are said to have been known as beautiful women..

Noninaga Motoi compares Seiya to Yamato Province Hiragun-gun, Seinomura (Nara Prefecture Ikoma County Misato Town).

Anecdotes of her birth in Kojiki 
In Kojiki, she is said to be the daughter of Omononushi. His birthplace is Mount Miwa in the Yamato region.

She is said to have originally been named Hottataraisukihime. She was said to have been beautiful like her mother. It is also said that she was a beautiful woman like her mother.

However, she disliked the word "hoto" and changed her name to Himetataraisuzu-hime.

The dropping of the "hoto" may be related to the word being linked to genitals.

Relation to Tatara Iron Manufacturing
There is a theory that the "Tatara" part of the name Himetataraisuzu-hime is interpreted in connection with Tatara iron manufacturing, indicating iron manufacturing in ancient Japan.

In other words, the fact that Emperor Jimmu took Himetataraisuzu-hime (= HimetataraHimetataraisuzu-hime = Hotataraisukihime) as his wife is interpreted as an indication that the royal family controlled the iron and steel industry. Yutaka Yoshino (Japan Literature Association) states that the name "HotataraHimetataraisuzu-hime" refers to a priestess who served the god of molten ore and the blast furnace.

Nomoninaga Motoi and other early modern Kokugaku scholars did not interpret the word "Tatara" in Himetataraisuzu-hime to mean a bellows. In their view, the word "Tatara" is a slang term used by blacksmiths and is dismissed from its ties to steelmaking as it is unsuitable for the name of a noble empress. "Some interpret "Tatara" as a derivative of "stand," meaning "stood up (surprised by an arrow in the pubic region)" or "had an arrow put up (in the pubic region).

Objects of faith
The Emperor Meiji founded the Kashihara Jingu in 1890, where Emperor Jimmu and Himetatharaisuhime are enshrined as the main deities.。

Here, the main deity is Himetataraisuzu-hime, but also Omononushi (father of Himetataraisuzu-hime according to the Kojiki), Seyadatara-hime (mother of Himetataraisuzu-hime according to the Kojiki), Kotoshirohime (mother of Himetataraisuzu-hime according to the Kojiki) Tamayori-hime, Kotoshironushi (father of Himetataraisukehime according to the Nihonshoki) are enshrined here.

She is also worshipped at Tsumori Jingu Shrine (Kumamoto Prefecture Kamimashiki District Mashiki Town) and Kosa Shrine (Kosa Town).

Genealogy

Family tree of descendants

Footnotes

Original text of "Nihon Shoki"

The original text of "Kojiki"

Notes

References

Literature

 "Mythological Hime Tachi: Another Kojiki", Sankei Shimbun, Sankei Shimbun, 2018, ISBN 978-4-8191-1336-6
 "Nihon no Kami Yomiwake Jiten" (An Encyclopedia of Japanese Gods), Kenji Kawaguchi/editor, Kashiwa Shobo, 1999, 2009 (9th printing), ISBN 4-7601-1824-1
 "Kojiki to Nihon no Kami ga Kunderu Hon" (The Book of Ancient Matters and Understanding Japanese Gods), Kunihiro Yoshida, Gakken Publishing, 2015, ISBN 978-4-05-406340-2
 "Illustrated Chronicle of the Emperors of the Rekishi", Edited by Masao Mitobe, Kazuo Higo, Shizuko Akagi, Shigetaka Fukuchi, Akita Shoten, 1989, ISBN 4-253-00297-8
 "Genealogical Compilation", New Edition, Vol. 1, Upper Section, Divine Emperors (1), edited by Yotohiko Iwasawa, Meisho Shuppan, 1996, ISBN 4-626-01541-7
 "A Genealogical Directory of the Empresses of the Rekishi Era" (Bessatsu Rekishi Yomibon 24, Vol. 27, No. 29, 618), Minoru Sato (ed.), Shinninjin Oraisha, 2002
 "Nihonjinmei Daijiten (Shin-Sen Otona-mei Jiten)" Vol.5, Kunihiko Shimonaka/editor, Heibonsha, 1938, 1979 (reprint edition)
 "Nihon Josei Jinmei Jiten (Dictionary of Japanese Women's Biographies), Popular Edition", edited by Noboru Haga, Yasuko Ichibanghase, Kuni Nakajima, Koichi Soda, Japan Book Center, 1998, ISBN 4-8205-7881-2
 "Dictionary of Japanese Historical Personal Names", Nichigai Associates, 1999, ISBN 4-8169-1527-3
 "Dictionary of Japanese Ancient Clans and Personal Names, Popular Edition", Taro Sakamoto and Kunio Hirano, Yoshikawa Kobunkan, 1990, 2010 (Popular Edition, 1st Edition), ISBN 978-4-642-01458-8
 "Nihon Rekishi Chimei Taikei 30 Nara-ken no Chimei" (Japanese Historical Chimei Compendium 30), Heibonsha, 1981.
 "Kadokawa Japanese Dictionary of Geographical Names 29: Nara Prefecture", Kadokawa Japanese Dictionary of Geographical Names Compilation Committee, Rizo Takeuchi, editor, Kadokawa Shoten,1990,ISBN 4-04-001290-9

Japanese empresses
Empresses dowager